The Bağıştaş 1 Dam is an embankment dam on the Karasu River near Bağıştaş in İliç district of Erzincan Province, eastern Turkey. The primary purpose of the dam is hydroelectric power generation and it supports a 140.4 MW power station. Construction began in 2011 and the generators were commissioned in 2015. It was officially dedicated by President Recep Tayyip Erdogan on 14 January 2016. The dam and power plant are owned and operated by Ictas Enerji Uretim ve Ticaret AS.

See also
Bağıştaş 2 Dam – downstream

References

Dams in Erzincan Province
Embankment dams
Dams completed in 2015
2015 establishments in Turkey
Energy infrastructure completed in 2015
Dams on the Karasu River
21st-century architecture in Turkey